Choreutis quincyella is a moth in the family Choreutidae. It was described by Henry Legrand in 1965. It is found on Menai Island.

References

Choreutis
Moths described in 1965